Seventeen is the debut album by British R&B singer Keisha White. The album features three singles: "Don't Care Who Knows" featuring the rapper, Cassidy, "Don't Fool A Woman In Love", and her critically acclaimed cover of Joan Armatrading's "The Weakness In Me", which is Keisha's biggest hit single to date, peaking inside the UK top 20. Eight songs were produced and co-written by Lucas Secon including both singles. All the key tracks appeared on her 2nd album.

Track listing

References 

2005 debut albums
Keisha White albums
Warner Music Group albums